Si Xingjian (1901–1964) was a Chinese paleobotanist and stratigrapher. He is considered among the first generation of Chinese paleontologists. He was born in Zhuji, Zhejiang Province and graduated from Peking University in 1926 before earning his Ph.D. degree from the University of Berlin in 1931. He was a researcher and director of the Institute of Paleontology, Chinese Academy of Sciences and held positions as a professor at Tsinghua University, Peking University and the Nanjing institute of Geology and Paleontology. He was also a director of the Chinese Paleontological Society and member of the editorial board of the Journal of Paleontology and the Chinese Journal of Paleontology.

Si's research focused on paleobotany, and he made significant contributions to the classification and evolution of paleobotany, comparative stratigraphic divisions, and phytogeographic distribution. He edited the Paleogene Flora of China, the first work to systematically summarize the problems of Chinese Paleogene flora and terrestrial stratigraphy. His book "Mesozoic Extended Stratigraphic Flora of Northern Shaanxi" was the first to point out the succession pattern of the Chinese Mesozoic flora and to propose a scheme for the delineation of the Chinese Mesozoic terrestrial stratigraphy.

Si also made a significant impact on the field of geology and paleobotany education. He taught the first paleobotany course in China at Tsinghua University and Peking University, and later taught at Nanjing University. He was known for being dedicated to teaching and sharing his insights with students and colleagues. Due to Si's tireless efforts, the study of paleobotany and terrestrial stratigraphy in China was greatly advanced.

References 

1901 births
1964 deaths
Humboldt University of Berlin alumni
Peking University alumni
People from Zhuji
Chinese paleontologists
Paleobotanists